Marino Cardelli (born 5 October 1987) is an alpine skier from San Marino. He competed in the giant slalom at the 2006 and 2010 Winter Olympics and served as the Olympic flag bearer for San Marino, as he was its only competitor at both games.

Career 
Son of a couple of teachers, Marino Cardelli was born on October 5, 1987, in Borgo Maggiore. With his parents and brother, he regularly went skiing in Italy during his youth.

Cardelli participated in Alpine ski races referenced by the International Ski Federation starting in 2002. He competed in the 2004 World Junior Championships, placing 101st in the giant slalom and disqualified in the super G3. The following year, he competed in the World Championships in the giant slalom, where he placed 69th, and then in the World Junior Championships in three disciplines, with his best result being 74th in the giant slalom.  In 2005-2006, he began his season with a shoulder and thumb injury. He was then the only representative of San Marino at the Olympic Games in Turin. Flag bearer for his delegation at the opening and closing ceremonies. Cardelli was lined up in the giant slalom where he was eliminated during the first run.

References 

1987 births
Living people
Sammarinese male alpine skiers
Olympic alpine skiers of San Marino
Alpine skiers at the 2006 Winter Olympics
Alpine skiers at the 2010 Winter Olympics